Carl August Ferdinand Bolbroe (November 24, 1833 -  October 28, 1878) was the Danish Royal Inspector of North Greenland from 1866 to 1867.

Biography
Bolbroe was born at  Egedesminde (now Aasiaat), Greenland. His father, Poul Georg Lauri Bolbroe (1810-1885), was from Bornholm, but worked for a number of years in Greenland.  He worked at the Inspectorate Office in Nuuk from 1829, and worked at several trading stations until 1843 when he moved home to Denmark. His mother Maren Elisabeth Bibiane Rasmussen was born in Greenland.   

Bolbroe graduated at Copenhagen in 1855. 
In 1861 he was hired as assistant in Kangersuatsiaq and in 1865 and went to Godhavn (now Nuuk)  as a volunteer. In 1866 he was appointed inspector for North Greenland. In 1867 he was succeeded by Sophus Theodor Krarup-Smith (1834-1882) who served until his death in 1882.

See also
 List of inspectors of Greenland

References 

1833 births
1878 deaths
Inspectors of Greenland
19th-century Danish people
History of the Arctic